Trial of Strength is a strategic level board wargame set in the Eastern Front of WWII, published by Panther Games in Australia in 1985. Employing a novel and sophisticated integrated movement and combat system called CLIMACS, the Trial of Strength between the two WWII superpowers of Germany and the Soviet Union could be simulated with great emphasis on maintaining initiative and momentum and rewarding sound battle plans.

Historical Synopsis 

The war on the Eastern Front was the most decisive of all theatres during the Second World War. Its outcome determined the face of Europe we know today. At its peak some 10 million men and women, 20,000 aircraft and over 10,000 armoured fighting vehicles were engaged in one of history's most fiercest and costly struggles, While most of the central and eastern European nations were involved it was essentially a trial of strength between the two military superpowers of the day - Germany and the Soviet Union.

Game-play 

Trial of Strength is a turn-based board wargame that puts the players in the shoes of armed forces commanders who must determine objectives, allocate forces and execute operations designed to achieve victory over your opponent.

The battlefield the game is played on is a hexagon-style 1:4,000,000 scale map of Eastern Europe with each hex represents 72 kilometres (45 miles) from side to side.

Each turn represents approximately 10 days, with 3 turns per month. Units are generally corps of the Axis and armies for the Soviet Union, both about 60,000 troops each, while also consisting of smaller battlegroups of specialist formations.

On top of the Conventional Land-warfare, Integrated Movement and Combat System (CLIMACS), players must handle game-play mechanics such as air power, command and control, morale, terrain and supply and logistics. Trial of Strength employs a special rule-set for the use of airborne, marine, mountain, artillery, rail-gun, rail construction NKVD and SS units.

The presence of an integrated political system into the game-play caters for historical events such as the reticence of Finland and the uprising of the Slovaks among others. While variable progress on the Western Front through the effects of Allied bombings and Partisans poses variable conditions for players.

Reception 

Trial of Strength has appeared in a number of publications including  Fire & Movement magazine, where the game featured on the cover of the 10th anniversary edition (number 49) in July/August 1986 and Breakout! The Australian Gamers' Quarterly magazine (number 22) in June - August 1986, which released two new official scenarios for the game covering the Balkans in 1941 and Poland in 1939.

A copy of Trial of Strength is also currently housed at the National Library of Australia (ID: 10524074) and is open to the public for viewing.

Reviews
The V.I.P. of Gaming Magazine #2 (Feb./March, 1986)

References

External links 

Board games introduced in 1985
Grand strategy board games
World War II board wargames